The 6th season of the television series Arthur was originally broadcast on PBS in the United States on September 24  to November 26, 2001 and contains 10 episodes.  A shortened version of the remix of the opening theme song, "Believe in Yourself", is played at the ending credits of this season as a promotion for the third music album of the franchise. Olympic figure skater Michelle Kwan guest starred on "The Good Sport" as herself. Justin Bradley replaced Michael Yarmush as Arthur, due to him getting too old to keep playing the character and this is the only season where he voices him. When Mark Rendall was hired to voice for Arthur in season 7, he re-dubbed for the U.S. reruns of season 6. Executive producer Carol Greenwald and Peter Moss said the reason was because Bradley's voice was too deep and lacked the vocal range of Michael Yarmush. Samuel Holden also replaced Ricky Mabe as Timmy Tibble. This is the last season where Steven Crowder voices Brain. This is also the last season where Oliver Grainger voices D.W.  The versions of these episodes with Bradley's voice were distributed in International VHS and DVD home media, and they are still aired on TV in countries outside and in North America.

Episodes

References 

General references 
 
 
 
 

2001 American television seasons
Arthur (TV series) seasons
2001 Canadian television seasons